A. shizuokensis may refer to:

Aleyrodes shizuokensis, a species of whitefly.
Alicyclobacillus shizuokensis, a Gram-positive bacterium.